Shiba may refer to:

Shiba Inu, a breed of dog
Shiba clan, Japanese clan originating in the Sengoku period
Shiba Inu (cryptocurrency), a decentralized cryptocurrency

Geography
Shiba, Tokyo, a former ward of Tokyo, Japan
Shiba Park in Tokyo
Shiba, Mingguang, in Mingguang, Anhui, PR China
Shiba, Boluo County, in Boluo County, Guangdong, PR China

People with the surname
 Cristian Shiba (born 2001), Albanian footballer
 Shiba Kōkan (1747–1818), Japanese painter and printmaker of the Edo period
, Japanese snowboarder
 Ryotaro Shiba (1923–1996), Japanese author
 Shigeharu Shiba (born 1932), anime audio director and producer
 Shiba Takatsune (1305–1367), the Constable (shugo) of Echizen Province during the 14th century
 Shiba Yoshimasa (1350–1410), Japanese general and administrator during the Muromachi period

Fictional characters:
 Kūkaku Shiba, Ganju Shiba and Kaien Shiba, fictional characters in Bleach
 Tatsuya Shiba and Miyuki Shiba, fictional characters in The Irregular at Magic High School
 Takeru Shiba and Kaoru Shiba, fictional characters in Samurai Sentai Shinkenger
 Jayden Shiba and Lauren Shiba, fictional characters in Power Rangers: Samurai

Japanese-language surnames